This is a list of Icelandic government ministries.

Ministries

Historical ministries

See also
Government agencies in Iceland

References
Cabinet of Iceland 
Cabinet of Iceland 

 
Ministries